Abu Ishaq Ibrahim bin Ahmed bin Ismail Alkhawas or Ebrahim Khawas (Persian ابراهیم الخواص) was a Persian scholar of the Sunnis in the 3rd century AH.

References

Iranian scholars
Year of birth unknown
People from Amol
Sunni Muslim scholars of Islam
8th-century astrologers
Medieval Iranian astrologers